Raasi may refer to:
 Raasi (film), a 1997 Tamil drama film
 Raasi (actress), South Indian actress